Tim Naberman (born 11 May 1999) is a Dutch cyclist, who currently rides for UCI WorldTeam .

Major results

2016
 3rd Overall Junior Cycling Tour Assen
 7th Overall Tour des Portes du Pays d'Othe
2017
 3rd Omloop van Noordwest Overijssel
 9th Overall Internationale Niedersachsen-Rundfahrt
2019
 5th Koningsronde van Beilen

References

External links

1999 births
Living people
Dutch male cyclists
People from Zwartewaterland
Cyclists from Overijssel